The 2010 Euroleague American Tour was the second American Tour organized by the Euroleague in the USA. The games were part of the NBA's preseason schedule and allowed the Euroleague teams to display some of their very particular characteristics to the American public, even under NBA rules. The Euroleague teams that participated in the second edition were CSKA Moscow and Caja Laboral. On the other hand, the NBA franchises that played against them were the Miami Heat, the Memphis Grizzlies, the San Antonio Spurs, the Oklahoma City Thunder, and the Cleveland Cavaliers.

Participants

Games

In the opening game on October 12, CSKA Moscow was determined to compete against the Heat even though they were playing without two starters, Victor Khryapa and J. R. Holden. Miami on the other hand was missing Dwyane Wade and needed LeBron James alongside Chris Bosh to step up. After a first half in which Ramūnas Šiškauskas and Trajan Langdon gave the opposite defense a tough challenge to face, CSKA was leading 44–39. In the second half James and Bosh were the leaders of a Heat comeback that eventually led to a 96–85 victory. They had 22 and 17 points respectively for the winners, whereas Langdon led all CSKA scorers with 20 points, Jamont Gordon had 17 and Šiškauskas 15.

On October 14, Caja Laboral fell short of a victory in Memphis against the Grizzlies, as they lost 110–105. Mike Conley led all scorers with 27 points, while Sam Young had 21. Mirza Teletović led the Spanish team with 24 points and 9 rebounds, Fernando San Emeterio scored 15 points and Marcelinho Huertas had an all-around performance with 7 points, 5 rebounds and 11 assists. The Thunder played the same day against CSKA in Oklahoma City, winning 97–89. Kevin Durant had 20 points, 5 rebounds and 7 assists for the winners, and Šiškauskas scored 17 for CSKA.

The last day of the tour was a history-changing one, as CSKA beat the Cavaliers to become the first international team ever to defeat an NBA franchise on US soil. In a game where both teams played without several key players (Khryapa and Holden for CSKA, Varejão, Parker, Jamison and Williams for the Cavs), the 2008 Euroleague MVP Ramūnas Šiškauskas made the difference by scoring 22 points and grabbing 5 rebounds. Jamont Gordon also was excellent with 19 points, 7 rebounds and 6 assists, whereas Trajan Langdon's 14 points were more than crucial. Cleveland gave a strong fight mainly through Daniel Gibson who scored 21 points, Ryan Hollins who had 17 and Ramon Sessions with 14. In the other game of the night Caja Laboral was unable to threaten the Spurs in San Antonio losing 108–85. Tony Parker led the winners with 22 points, while David Logan and Mirza Teletović scored 20 and 18 respectively.

See also
2012 Euroleague American Tour

External links
Official 2010 Euroleague American Tour Website

2010
2010–11 Euroleague
Euroleague
2010–11 in Spanish basketball
2010–11 in Russian basketball